In ancient Greek mythology and religion, Selene (meaning "Moon") is the personification of the Moon. Also known as Mene, she is traditionally the daughter of the Titans Hyperion and Theia, and sister of the sun god Helios and the dawn goddess Eos. She drives her moon chariot across the heavens. Several lovers are attributed to her in various myths, including Zeus, Pan, and the mortal Endymion. In post-classical times, Selene was often identified with Artemis, much as her brother, Helios, was identified with Apollo. Selene and Artemis were also associated with Hecate and all three were regarded as moon and lunar goddesses, but only Selene was regarded as the personification of the Moon itself. Her Roman equivalent is Luna.

Names and etymology 

The name "Selene" is derived from the Greek noun selas, meaning "light, brightness, gleam".

Selene was also called Mene. The Greek word mene, meant the moon, and the lunar month. The masculine form of mene (men) was also the name of the Phrygian moon-god Men. Mene and Men both derive from Proto-Hellenic *méns ("month"), itself from Proto-Indo-European *mḗh₁n̥s (meaning moon, the lunar month), which probably comes from the root *meh₁- ("to measure"), and is cognate with the English words "Moon" and "month". The Greek Stoic philosopher Chrysippus interpreted Selene and Men as, respectively, the female and male aspects of the same god.

Just as Helios, from his identification with Apollo, is called Phoebus ("bright"), Selene, from her identification with Artemis, is also called Phoebe (feminine form).  Also from Artemis, Selene was sometimes called "Cynthia", meaning "she of Mount Cynthus" (the birthplace of Artemis).

Origin 
Selene, along with her brother, her sister and the sky-god Zeus, is one of the few Greek deities of a clear Proto-Indo-European origin, although they were sidelined by later non-PIE newcomers to the pantheon, as remaining on the sidelines became their primary function, to be the minor deities the major ones were juxtaposed to, thus helping keep the Greek religion Greek. 

The original PIE moon deity has been reconstructed as *Meh₁not (from which 'Mene', Selene's byname, is derived), and it appears that it was a male god. In PIE mythology, the Moon, which is a male figure, was seen as forming a pair–usually wedlock–with the Sun, which is a female figure, and which in Greek mythology is recognized in the male deity and Selene's brother Helios. It seems however that unlike the Dawn (Eos) and the Sun (Helios), the Moon had very little importance in PIE mythology.

Although attempts have been made to connect Selene to Helene due to the similarity of their names, in two early dedications to Helen from Laconia her name is spelled with a digamma, ruling out any possible connection between them. 'Helen' is related to 'Helios' instead, and it seems that they two figures stem from a common Proto-Indo-European ancestor, the Sun Maiden.

Descriptions

Surviving descriptions of Selene's physical appearance and character, apart from those which would apply to the moon itself, are scant. There is no mention of Selene as a goddess in either the Iliad or the Odyssey of Homer, while her only mention in Hesiod's Theogony is as the daughter of Hyperion and  Theia, and sister of Helios and Eos. She was, however, the subject of one of the thirty-three Homeric Hymns, which gives the following description:

Two other sources also mention her hair. The Homeric Hymn to Helios uses the same epithet εὐπλόκαμος ("bright-tressed"), used in the above Hymn to Selene (elsewhere translated as "rich-", "lovely-", or "well-tressed"), while Epimenides uses the epithet ἠυκόμοιο ("lovely-haired").

In late accounts, Selene (like the moon itself) is often described as having horns. The Orphic Hymn to Selene addresses her as "O bull-horned Moon", and further describes her as "torch-bearing, ... feminine and masculine, ... lover of horses," and grantor of "fulfillment and favor". Empedocles, Euripides and Nonnus all describe her as γλαυκῶπις (glaukṓpis, "bright-eyed", a common epithet of the goddess Athena) while in a fragment from a poem, possibly written by Pamprepius, she is called κυανῶπις (kyanṓpis, "dark-eyed"). Mesomedes of Crete calls her γλαυκὰ (glaukà, "silvery grey").

Family

Parents 

The usual account of Selene's origin is given by Hesiod in his Theogony, where the sun-god Hyperion espoused his sister Theia, who gave birth to "great Helios and clear Selene and Eos who shines upon all that are on earth and upon the deathless Gods who live in the wide heaven". The Homeric Hymn to Helios follows this tradition: "Hyperion wedded glorious Euryphaëssa, his own sister, who bare him lovely children, rosy-armed Eos and rich-tressed Selene and tireless Helios", with Euryphaëssa ("widely shining") probably being an epithet of Theia. However, the Homeric Hymn to Hermes has Selene as the daughter of Pallas, the son of an otherwise unknown Megamedes. This Pallas is possibly identified with the Pallas, who, according to Hesiod's Theogony, was the son of the Titan Crius, and thus Selene's cousin. Other accounts give still other parents for Selene: Euripides has Selene as the daughter of Helios (rather than sister), while an Aeschylus fragment possibly has Selene as the daughter of Leto, as does a scholium on Euripides's play The Phoenician Women which adds Zeus as the father. Furthermore, in Virgil's Aeneid, when Nisus calls upon Selene/the Moon, he addresses her as "daughter of Latona."

Offspring 
According to the Homeric Hymn to Selene, the goddess bore Zeus a daughter, Pandia ("All-brightness"), "exceeding lovely amongst the deathless gods". The 7th century BC Greek poet Alcman makes Ersa ("Dew") the daughter of Selene and Zeus. Selene and Zeus were also said to be the parents of Nemea, the eponymous nymph of Nemea, where Heracles slew the Nemean Lion, and where the Nemean Games were held.

From Pausanias we hear that Selene was supposed to have had fifty daughters, by her lover Endymion, often assumed to represent the fifty lunar months of the Olympiad. Nonnus has Selene and Endymion as the parents of the beautiful Narcissus, although in other accounts, including Ovid's Metamorphoses, Narcissus was the son of Cephissus and Liriope.

Quintus Smyrnaeus makes Selene, by her brother Helios, the mother of the Horae, goddesses and personifications of the four seasons; Winter, Spring, Summer, and Autumn. Quintus describes them as the four handmaidens of Hera, but in most other accounts their number is three; Eirene ("peace"), Eunomia ("order"), and Dike ("justice"), and their parents are Zeus and Themis instead.

Lastly, Selene was said to be the mother of the legendary Greek poet Musaeus, with, according to Philochorus, the father being the legendary seer Eumolpus.

Mythology

Goddess of the Moon 

Like her brother Helios, the Sun god, who drives his sun chariot across the sky each day, Selene is also said to drive a chariot across the heavens. There are no mentions of Selene's chariot in either Homer or Hesiod, but the Homeric Hymn to Selene, gives the following description:

The earliest known depiction of Selene driving a chariot adorns the inside of an early 5th century BC red-figure cup attributed to the Brygos Painter, showing Selene plunging her chariot, drawn by two winged horses, into the sea (Berlin Antikensammlung F 2293). The geographer Pausanias, reports seeing a relief of Selene driving a single horse, as it seemed to him, or as some said, a mule, on the pedestal of the Statue of Zeus at Olympia (c. 435 BC). While the sun chariot has four horses, Selene's usually has two, described as "snow-white" by Ovid. In some later accounts the chariot was drawn by oxen or bulls.  Though the moon chariot is often described as being silver, for Pindar it was golden.

In antiquity, the lunar eclipse phenomena were thought to be caused by witches, particularly the ones from Thessaly, who brought the Moon/Selene down with spells and invocations of magic. A famous example of that is Aglaonice of Thessaly, an ancient Greek astronomer, who was regarded as a sorceress for her (self-proclaimed) ability to make the Moon disappear from the sky (: kathaireĩn tén selénen). This claim has been taken–by Plutarch at first, and subsequently by modern astronomers–to mean that she could predict the time and general area where an eclipse of the Moon would occur. Those who brought down the Moon were thought to bring ill fortune upon themselves, as evidenced by the proverb  ("you are bringing down the Moon on yourself") said for those who caused self-inflicted evils; some witches supposedly avoided this fate by sacrificing their children or their eyeballs.

Endymion 

Selene is best known for her affair with the beautiful mortal Endymion. The late 7th-century – early 6th-century BC poet Sappho apparently mentioned Selene and Endymion. However, the first account of the story comes from the third-century BC Argonautica of Apollonius of Rhodes, which tells of Selene's "mad passion" and her visiting the "fair Endymion" in a cave on Mount Latmus:

The eternally sleeping Endymion was proverbial, but exactly how this eternal sleep came about and what role, if any, Selene may have had in it is unclear. According to the Catalogue of Women, Endymion was the son of Aethlius (a son of Zeus), and Zeus granted him the right to choose when he would die. A scholiast on Apollonius says that, according to Epimenides, Endymion fell in love with Hera, and Zeus punished him with eternal sleep.  However, Apollodorus says that because of Endymion's "surpassing beauty, the Moon fell in love with him, and Zeus allowed him to choose what he would, and he chose to sleep for ever, remaining deathless and ageless". Theocritus portrays Endymion's sleep as enviable because (presumably) of Selene's love for him. Cicero seems to make Selene responsible for Endymion's sleep, so that "she might kiss him while sleeping". The Roman playwright Seneca, has Selene abandoned the night sky for Endymion's sake having entrusted her "shining" moon chariot to her brother Helios to drive. The Greek satirist Lucian's dialogue between Selene and the love goddess Aphrodite has the two goddesses commiserate about their love affairs with Endymion and Adonis, and suggests that Selene has fallen in love with Endymion while watching him sleep each night. In his dialogue between Aphrodite and Eros, Lucian also has Aphrodite admonish her son Eros for bringing Selene "down from the sky". While Quintus Smyrnaeus wrote that, while Endymion slept in his cave beside his cattle:

Lucian also records an otherwise unattested myth where a pretty young girl called Muia becomes Selene's rival for Endymion's affections; the chatty maiden would endlessly talk to him while he slept, causing him to wake up. This irritated Endymion, and enraged Selene, who transforms the girl into a fly. In memory of the beautiful Endymion, the fly still grudges all sleepers their rest and annoys them.

Philologist Max Müller's interpretation of solar mythology as it related to Selene and Endymion concluded that the myth was a narrativized version of linguistic terminology. Because the Greek endyein meant "to dive," the name Endymion ("Diver") at first simply described the process of the setting sun "diving" into the sea. In this case, the story of Selene embracing Endymion, or Moon embraces Diver, refers to the sun setting and the moon rising.

Gigantomachy 

Gaia, angered about her children the Titans being thrown into Tartarus following their defeat, brought forth the Giants, to attack the gods, in a war that was called the Gigantomachy. When Gaia heard of a prophecy that a mortal would help the gods to defeat the giants, she sought to find a herb that would make them undefeatable. Zeus heard of that, and ordered Selene as well as her siblings Helios (Sun) and Eos (Dawn) not to shine, and harvested all of that plant for himself. Selene's participation in the battle is evidenced by her inclusion in the Gigantomachy frieze of the Pergamon Altar, fighting against Giants next to her siblings Helios and Eos and her mother Theia in the southern frieze. Selene gallops sidesaddle in advance, and wears a woolen undergarment and a mantle. Additionally, on a rein guide for a chariot a goddess thought to be Selene with a crescent and veil over her head is depicted, who stands with Helios on a gate tower and tries to repel the attacks of snake-legged Giants.

Fight with Typhon 
According to the late account of Nonnus, when the gigantic monster Typhon laid siege against the heavens, he attacked Selene as well by hurling bulls at her, though she managed to stay in her course, and rushed at her hissing like a viper. Selene fought back the giant, locking horns with Typhon; afterwards, she carried many scars on her orb, reminiscent of their battle.

Ampelus 
Ampelus was a very beautiful satyr youth, loved by the god Dionysus. One day, in Nonnus' account, Ampelus rode on a bull, and proceeded to compare himself to Selene, saying that he was her equal, having horns and riding bulls just like her. The goddess took offense, and sent a gadfly to sting Ampelus' bull. The bull panicked, threw Ampelus and gored him to death.

Heracles 

When Zeus desired to sleep with the mortal queen Alcmene and sire Heracles, he made the night last three days, and ordered Selene via Hermes to dawdle in the sky during that time.

Selene also played a small role in the first of Heracles' twelve labours; whereas for Hesiod, the Nemean Lion was born to Orthrus and the Chimera (or perhaps Echidna) and raised by Hera, other accounts have Selene involved in some way in its birth or rearing. Aelian states: "They say that the Lion of Nemea fell from the moon", and quotes Epimenides as saying:

Anaxagoras also reports that the Nemean lion was said to have fallen from the moon. Pseudo-Plutarch's On Rivers has Hera collaborating with Selene, "employing magical incantations" to create the Nemean Lion from a chest filled with foam. Hyginus says that Selene had "nourished" the lion in a "two-mouthed cave".

Pan 
According to Virgil, Selene also had a tryst with the god Pan, who seduced her with a "snowy bribe of wool". Scholia on Virgil add the story, ascribed to Nicander, that as part of the seduction, Pan wrapped himself in a sheepskin.

Other accounts 

Diodorus Siculus recorded an unorthodox version of the myth, in which Basileia, who had succeeded her father Uranus to his royal throne, married her brother Hyperion, and had two children, a son Helios and a daughter Selene, "admired for both their beauty and their chastity". Because Basileia's other brothers envied these offspring, and feared that Hyperion would try to seize power for himself, they conspired against him. They put Hyperion to the sword, and drowned Helios in the river Eridanus. Selene herself, upon discovering this, took her own life. After these deaths, her brother appeared in a dream to their grieving mother and assured her that he and his sister would now transform into divine natures; and:

Plutarch recorded a fable-like story in which Selene asked her mother to weave her a garment to fit her measure, and her mother replied that she was unable to do so, as she kept changing shape and size, sometimes full, then crescent-shaped and others yet half her size.

In Lucian's Icaromenippus, Selene complains to the titular Menippus of all the outrageous claims philosophers are making about her, such as wondering why she is ever waxing or gibbous, whether she is populated or not, and stating that she is getting her stolen light from the Sun, causing strife and ill feelings between her and her brother. She asks Menippus to report her grievances to Zeus, with the request that Zeus wipes all these natural philosophers from the face of the earth. Zeus agrees, urged by Selene's complaints and having long intended to deal with the philosophers himself.

Claudian wrote that in her infancy, when her horns had not yet grown, Selene (along with Helios – their sister Eos is not mentioned with them) was nursed by her aunt, the water goddess Tethys.

According to pseudo-Plutarch, Lilaeus was an Indian shepherd who only worshipped Selene among the gods and performed her rituals and mysteries at night. The other gods, angered, sent him two lions to tear him apart. Selene then turned Lilaeus into a mountain, Mt. Lilaeon.

Ovid mentions how in the myth of Phaethon, Helios' son who drove his father's chariot for a day, when Phaethon lost control of the chariot and burned the earth, Selene in the sky looked down to see in amazement her brother's horses running wild lower than normal.

Iconography 

In antiquity, artistic representations of Selene/Luna included sculptural reliefs, vase paintings, coins, and gems. In red-figure pottery before the early 5th century BC, she is depicted only as a bust, or in profile against a lunar disk. In later art, like other celestial divinities such as Helios, Eos, and Nyx (Night), Selene rides across the heavens. She is usually portrayed either driving a chariot (see above) or riding sideways on horseback (sometimes riding an ox, a mule or a ram).

Selene was often paired with her brother Helios. Selene (probably) and Helios adorned the east pediment of the Parthenon, where the two, each driving a four-horsed chariot, framed a scene depicting the birth of Athena, with Helios and his chariot rising from the ocean on the left, and Selene and her chariot descending into the sea on the right. Selene and Helios also appear on the North Metopes of the Parthenon, with Selene this time entering the sea on horseback. From Pausanias, we learn that Selene and Helios also framed the birth of Aphrodite on the base of the Statue of Zeus at Olympia. There are indications of a similar framing by Selene and Helios of the birth of Pandora on the base of the Athena Parthenos. Pausanias also reports seeing stone images of Helios, and Selene, in the market-place at Elea, with rays projecting from the head of Helios, and horns from the head of Selene. Selene also appears on horseback as part of the Gigantomachy frieze of the Pergamon Altar.

Selene is commonly depicted with a crescent moon, often accompanied by stars; sometimes, instead of a crescent, a lunar disc is used. Often a crescent moon rests on her brow, or the cusps of a crescent moon protrude, horn-like, from her head, or from behind her head or shoulders. Selene's head is sometimes surrounded by a nimbus, and from the Hellenistic period onwards, she is sometimes pictured with a torch.

In later second and third century AD Roman funerary art, the love of Selene for Endymion and his eternal sleep was a popular subject for artists. As frequently depicted on Roman sarcophagi, Selene, holding a billowing veil forming a crescent over her head, descends from her chariot to join her lover, who slumbers at her feet.

Cult

Moon figures are found on Cretan rings and gems (perhaps indicating a Minoan moon cult), but apart from the role played by the moon itself in magic, folklore, and poetry, and despite the later worship of the Phrygian moon-god Men, there was relatively little worship of Selene. An oracular sanctuary existed near Thalamai in Laconia. Described by Pausanias, it contained statues of Pasiphaë and Helios. Here Pasiphaë is used as an epithet of Selene, instead of referring to the daughter of Helios and wife of Minos. Pausanias also described seeing two stone images in the market-place of Elis, one of the sun and the other of the moon, from the heads of which projected the rays of the sun and the horns of the crescent moon. Selene (along with Helios, Nyx and others) received an altar at the sanctuary of Demeter at Pergamon, possibly in connection with the Orphic mysteries.

Originally, Pandia may have been an epithet of Selene, but by at least the time of the late Hymn to Selene, Pandia had become a daughter of Zeus and Selene. Pandia (or Pandia Selene) may have personified the full moon, and an Athenian festival, called the Pandia, usually considered to be a festival for Zeus, was perhaps celebrated on the full moon and may have been associated with Selene. At Athens, wineless offerings (nephalia) were made to Selene, along with other celestial gods, Selene's siblings Helios and Eos, and Aphrodite Ourania; in Attica, it seems that Selene was identified with Aphrodite.

Selene was sometimes associated with childbirth, for it was believed that during the full moon women had the easiest labours; this helped in her identification with the goddess Artemis, as well as other goddesses connected to women's labours. The idea that Selene would also give easy labours to women paved way for identification with Hera and  the Roman Juno and Lucina, three other childbirth goddesses; Plutarch calls Selene "Hera in material form." Roman philosopher Cicero connected Selene's Roman counterpart Luna's name to childbirth goddess Lucina's, both deriving from "light" (thus bringing the unborn child into the light). Nonnus also identified Selene with Eileithyia.

Selene played an important role in love magic. In Theocritus' second Idyll, a young girl invokes Selene in a love-spell. The idyll opens with the girl ordering her maid to bring potions and magical utensils, followed by an invocation to Selene and Hecate, and finally the rather lengthy spell itself; once she finishes her spell, the girl recounts to Selene of how she met and was betrayed by her lover, and calls upon the goddess to witness and help her, hence the love tail is woven into the love spell. And, according to a scholium on Theocritus, Pindar wrote that lovesick women would pray to Selene for help, as Euripides apparently had Phaedra, Selene's great-niece, do in his lost play Hippolytus Veiled. Plutarch wrote that Selene was called upon in love affairs because she, the Moon, constantly yearns for the Sun, and compared her in that regard to Isis.

Her and her brother's worship is also attested in Gytheum, a town in Laconia near Sparta, via an inscription (C.I.G. 1392). In the city of Epidaurus, in Argolis, Selene had an altar dedicated to her. Records show that a type of cake called  (boûs, "ox") decorated with horns to represent the full moon or an ox was offered to her and other divinities like Hecate, Artemis and Apollo. In addition, a type of flat, round moon-shaped cake was called 'selene' ("moon") and was offered "to the goddess."

The ancient Greeks called Monday "day of the Moon" (ἡμέρα Σελήνης) after her.

Orphic literature
According to a certain Epigenes, the three Moirai, or Fates, were regarded in the Orphic tradition as representing the three divisions of Selene, "the thirtieth and the fifteenth and the first" (i.e. the crescent moon, full moon, and dark moon, as delinted by the divisions of the calendar month).

Namesakes

In astronomy 
Selene is the Greek proper name for the Moon, and 580 Selene, a minor planet in the asteroid belt, is also named after this goddess.

In chemistry 
The chemical element Selenium was named after Selene by Jöns Jacob Berzelius, because of the element's similarity to the element tellurium, named for the Earth (Tellus).

Vehicles 
The second Japanese lunar orbiter spacecraft following was named SELENE (Selenological and Engineering Explorer) after Selene, and was also known as Kaguya in Japan. HMS Selene (P254), a 1944 British submarine and Ghia Selene, a concept car from the Ghia design studio from 1959, also bore her name.

Gallery

Genealogy

See also 

 Horned deity
 List of lunar deities
 Diana (mythology)
 Star and crescent

Notes

References

 Aelian, On Animals, Volume III: Books 12-17, translated by A. F. Scholfield, Loeb Classical Library No. 449, Cambridge, Massachusetts, Harvard University Press, 1959.  Online version at Harvard University Press. .
 Aeschylus, Fragments, edited and translated by Alan H. Sommerstein, Loeb Classical Library No. 505. Cambridge, Massachusetts: Harvard University Press, 2009. . Online version at Harvard University Press.
 Allen, Thomas W., E. E. Sikes. The Homeric Hymns, edited, with preface, apparatus criticus, notes, and appendices.  London. Macmillan. 1904.
 Anaxagoras, Anaxagoras of Clazomenae: Fragments and Testimonia: A Text and Translation with Notes and Essays, edited and translated by Patricia Curd, University of Toronto Press, 2007. .
 Apollodorus, Apollodorus, The Library, with an English Translation by Sir James George Frazer, F.B.A., F.R.S. in 2 Volumes. Cambridge, Massachusetts, Harvard University Press; London, William Heinemann Ltd. 1921.
 Apollonius of Rhodes,  Argonautica; with an English translation by R. C. Seaton. William Heinemann, 1912. Internet Archive.
 Aratus Solensis, Phaenomena translated by G. R. Mair. Loeb Classical Library Volume 129. London: William Heinemann, 1921. Online version at the Topos Text Project.
 Aristotle, Aristotle in 23 Volumes, Vol. 19, translated by H. Rackham. Cambridge, Massachusetts, Harvard University Press; London, William Heinemann Ltd. 1934.
 Astour, Michael C., Hellenosemitica: An Ethinic and Cultural Study in West Semitic Impact on Mycenaean Greece, Brill Archive, 1965.
 Athanassakis, Apostolos N., and Benjamin M. Wolkow, The Orphic Hymns, Johns Hopkins University Press, 2013. . Google Books.
 
 Bekker, Immanuel, Anecdota Graeca: Lexica Segueriana, Apud G.C. Nauckium, 1814.
 Blum, Rudolf, Kallimachos: The Alexandrian Library and the Origins of Bibliography, translated by	Hans H. Wellisch, University of Wisconsin Press, 2011. .
 Brill’s New Pauly: Encyclopaedia of the Ancient World, Volume 13, Sas-Syl, editors: Hubert Cancik, Helmuth Schneider, Brill Publishers, 2008. . Online version.
 
 
 Caldwell, Richard, Hesiod's Theogony, Focus Publishing/R. Pullins Company (June 1, 1987). .
 Campbell, David A., Greek Lyric, Volume I: Sappho and Alcaeus,  Loeb Classical Library No. 142, Cambridge, Massachusetts, Harvard University Press, 1990. . Online version at Harvard University Press.
 Cashford, Jules, (2003a), The Homeric Hymns, Penguin Books, 2003. . Internet Archive.
 Cashford, Jules, (2003b), The Moon: Myth and Image, Four Walls Eight Windows, New York, 2003. .
 Catullus, Catullus. Tibullus. Pervigilium Veneris., translated by F. W. Cornish, J. P. Postgate, J. W. Mackail, revised by G. P. Goold, Loeb Classical Library No. 6, Cambridge, Massachusetts, Harvard University Press, 1913. . Online version at Harvard University Press.
 Cicero, Cicero's Tusculan Disputations, translated by C. D. Yonge; Harpers & Brothers, publishers, 1888.
 de Clarac, Frédéric, Musée de Sculpture antique et moderne, ou description historique et graphique du Louvre (Paris: Imprimerie Royale, 1828, etc.), vol. 2.
 Claudian, Rape of Persephone in Claudian with an English Translation by Maurice Platnauer, Volume II, Loeb Classical Library No. 136. Cambridge, Massachusetts: Harvard University Press; London: William Heinemann, Ltd.. 1922. . Internet Archive.
 Cohen, Beth, "Outline as a Special Technique in Black- and Red-figure Vase-painting", in The Colors of Clay: Special Techniques in Athenian Vases, Getty Publications, 2006, .
 Collard and Cropp in Euripides, Fragments: Aegeus-Meleager, edited and translated by Christopher Collard, Martin Cropp, Loeb Classical Library No. 504, Cambridge, Massachusetts, Harvard University Press, 2008. . Online version at Harvard University Press.
 Cook, Arthur Bernard, Zeus: A Study in Ancient Religion, Volume I: Zeus God of the Bright Sky, Cambridge University Press 1914. Internet Archive.
 Propertius, Elegies Edited and translated by G. P. Goold. Loeb Classical Library 18. Cambridge, Massachusetts: Harvard University Press, 1990.  Online version at Harvard University Press.
 Cox, George W. The Mythology of the Aryan Nations Part, Vol. II, London, C. Kegan Paul & Co., 1 Paternoster Square, 1878. Internet Archive.
 
 Diodorus Siculus, Diodorus Siculus: The Library of History. translated by C. H. Oldfather, twelve volumes, Loeb Classical Library, Cambridge, Massachusetts: Harvard University Press; London: William Heinemann, Ltd. 1989. Online version by Bill Thayer.
 Edmonds, John Maxwell, (1922), Lyra Graeca, W. Heinemann, 1922.
 Edmonds, Radcliffe (2013), Redefining Ancient Orphism: A Study in Greek Religion, Cambridge; New York:  Cambridge University Press. .
 Empedocles in Early Greek Philosophy, Volume V: Western Greek Thinkers, Part 2. , edited and translated by André Laks, Glenn W. Most, Loeb Classical Library No. 528, Cambridge, Massachusetts, Harvard University Press, 2016. . Online version at Harvard University Press.
 Euripides, The Complete Greek Drama', edited by Whitney J. Oates and Eugene O'Neill, Jr. in two volumes. 2. The Phoenissae, translated by E. P. Coleridge. New York. Random House. 1938.
 Euripides, Fragments: Oedipus-Chrysippus: Other Fragments, edited and translated by Christopher Collard, Martin Cropp, Loeb Classical Library No. 506. Cambridge, Massachusetts, Harvard University Press, 2008. . Online version at Harvard University Press.
 Evelyn-White, Hugh, The Homeric Hymns and Homerica with an English Translation by Hugh G. Evelyn-White. Homeric Hymns. Cambridge, Massachusetts, Harvard University Press; London, William Heinemann Ltd. 1914.
 Fairbanks, Arthur, The Mythology of Greece and Rome.  D. Appleton–Century Company, New York, 1907.
 Faraone, Christopher A., Ancient Greek Love Magic, Harvard University Press, 2009. .
 Fowler, R. L. (2000), Early Greek Mythography: Volume 1: Text and Introduction, Oxford University Press, 2000. .
 Fowler, R. L. (2013), Early Greek Mythography: Volume 2: Commentary, Oxford University Press, 2013. .
 Freeman, Kathleen, Ancilla to the Pre-Socratic Philosophers: A Complete Translation of the Fragments in Diels, Fragmente Der Vorsokratiker, Harvard University Press, 1983. .
 
 Gantz, Timothy, Early Greek Myth: A Guide to Literary and Artistic Sources, Johns Hopkins University Press, 1996, Two volumes:  (Vol. 1),  (Vol. 2).
 The Greek Anthology, Volume I: Book 1: Christian Epigrams, Book 2: Description of the Statues in the Gymnasium of Zeuxippus, Book 3: Epigrams in the Temple of Apollonis at Cyzicus, Book 4: Prefaces to the Various Anthologies, Book 5: Erotic Epigrams, translated by W. R. Paton. Revised by Michael A. Tueller, Loeb Classical Library No. 67, Cambridge, Massachusetts, Harvard University Press, 2014. . Online version at Harvard University Press.
 Gury, Françoise, "Selene, Luna" in Lexicon Iconographicum Mythologiae Classicae (LIMC) VII.1 Artemis Verlag, Zürich and Munich, 1994. .
 Grimal, Pierre, The Dictionary of Classical Mythology, Wiley-Blackwell, 1996. .
 Hansen, William F., Handbook of classical mythology, ABC-CLIO, 2004. .
 Hard, Robin, The Routledge Handbook of Greek Mythology: Based on H.J. Rose's "Handbook of Greek Mythology", Psychology Press, 2004, . Google Books.
 Hesiod, Theogony, in The Homeric Hymns and Homerica with an English Translation by Hugh G. Evelyn-White, Cambridge, Massachusetts, Harvard University Press; London, William Heinemann Ltd. 1914. Online version at the Perseus Digital Library.
 Honan, Mary McMahon, Guide to the Pergamon Museum, De Gruyter, 1904. . Online version at De Gruyter.
 Hurwit, Jeffery M. (1999), "The" Athenian Acropolis: History, Mythology, and Archaeology from the Neolithic Era to the Present, CUP Archive, 1999. .
 Hurwit, Jeffery M. (2017), "Helios Rising: The Sun, the Moon, and the Sea in the Sculptures of the Parthenon", American Journal of Archaeology, Vol. 121, No. 4 (October 2017), pp. 527–558. .
 Hyginus, Gaius Julius, Fabulae, in The Myths of Hyginus, edited and translated by Mary A. Grant, Lawrence: University of Kansas Press, 1960. Online version at ToposText.
 Jebb, Richard Claverhouse, Bacchylides: The Poems and Fragments, Georg Olms Verlag, 1905, 1994. .
 Jones, Prudence H., "A Goddess Arrives: Nineteenth Century Sources of the New Age Triple Moon Goddess" in Culture and Cosmos, 19(1): 45–70.
 Julius Pollux, Onomasticon: cum annotationibus interpretum. VI - X, Volume 2, Kuehn, 1824. Google books.
 Kerényi, Karl (1951), The Gods of the Greeks,  Thames and Hudson, London, 1951. Internet Archive.
 Keightley, Thomas, The Mythology of Ancient Greece and Italy, G. Bell and Sons, 1877.
 Liddell, Henry George, Robert Scott, A Greek-English Lexicon, revised and augmented throughout by Sir Henry Stuart Jones with the assistance of Roderick McKenzie, Clarendon Press Oxford, 1940. Online version at the Perseus Digital Library.
 Lightfoot, J. L., Hellenistic Collection: Philitas, Alexander of Aetolia, Hermesianax, Euphorion, Parthenius, edited and translated by J. L. Lightfoot, Loeb Classical Library No. 508, Cambridge, Massachusetts, Harvard University Press, 2010. . Online version at Harvard University Press.
 Lucian, Dialogues of the Dead. Dialogues of the Sea-Gods. Dialogues of the Gods. Dialogues of the Courtesans, translated by M. D. MacLeod, Loeb Classical Library No. 431, Cambridge, Massachusetts, Harvard University Press, 1961. . Online version at Harvard University Press. Internet Archive.
 Lucian, Phalaris. Hippias or The Bath. Dionysus. Heracles. Amber or The Swans. The Fly. Nigrinus. Demonax. The Hall. My Native Land. Octogenarians. A True Story. Slander. The Consonants at Law. The Carousal (Symposium) or The Lapiths translated by A. M. Harmon. Loeb Classical Library No. 14. Cambridge, Massachusetts, Harvard University Press, 1913. . Online version at Harvard University Press.
 Lucian, The Downward Journey or The Tyrant. Zeus Catechized. Zeus Rants. The Dream or The Cock. Prometheus. Icaromenippus or The Sky-man. Timon or The Misanthrope. Charon or The Inspectors. Philosophies for Sale, translated by A. M. Harmon. Loeb Classical Library No. 54. Cambridge, Massachusetts, Harvard University Press, 1915. . Online version at Harvard University Press.
 Macrobius, Saturnalia, Volume II: Books 3-5, edited and translated by Robert A. Kaster, Loeb Classical Library No. 511, Cambridge, Massachusetts, Harvard University Press, 2011. . Online version at Harvard University Press.
 
 
 Mayerson, Philip, Classical Mythology in Literature, Art, and Music, Focus publishing, R. Pullins Company, 2001. .
 Meagher, Robert E., The Meaning of Helen: In Search of an Ancient Icon, Bolchazy-Carducci Publishers, 2002. .
 Mesomedes in Lyra Græca: Specimens of the Greek Lyric Poets, from Callinus to Soutsos. Edited, with critical Notes, and a biographical Introduction, by James Donaldson (Edinburgh & London, 1854) p. 96f.
 Mitchell, Lucy M., "Sculptures of the Great Pergamon Altar" in The Century Magazine, 1883.
 Morford, Mark P. O., Robert J. Lenardon, Classical Mythology, Eighth Edition, Oxford University Press, 2007. . Internet Archive.
 Most, G.W. (2018a), Hesiod, Theogony, Works and Days, Testimonia, Edited and translated by Glenn W. Most, Loeb Classical Library No. 57, Cambridge, Massachusetts, Harvard University Press, 2018. . Online version at Harvard University Press.
 Most, G.W. (2018b), Hesiod: The Shield, Catalogue of Women, Other Fragments, Loeb Classical Library, No. 503, Cambridge, Massachusetts, Harvard University Press, 2007, 2018. . Online version at Harvard University Press.
 Müller, Karl Wilhelm Ludwig, Fragmenta Historicorum Graecorum, Volume I, 1841. Internet Archive.
 Murray, Alexander Stuart (1892), Handbook of Greek Archæology, John Murray, 1892.
 Murray, Alexander Stuart (1903), The Sculptures of the Parthenon, John Murray, 1903.
 ní Mheallaigh, Karen, The Moon in the Greek and Roman Imagination: Myth, Literature, Science and Philosophy, Cambridge University Press, 2020. .
 Nonnus, Dionysiaca, Volume I: Books 1–15, translated by W. H. D. Rouse, Loeb Classical Library No. 344, Cambridge, Massachusetts, Harvard University Press, 1940 (revised 1984).  . Online version at Harvard University Press. Internet Archive (1940).
 Nonnus, Dionysiaca, Volume III: Books 36–48, translated by W. H. D. Rouse, Loeb Classical Library No. 346, Cambridge, Massachusetts, Harvard University Press; London, William Heinemann Ltd. 1940.  . Online version at Harvard University Press. Internet Archive (1940, reprinted 1942).
 Obbink, Dirk (2002), "'All Gods are True' in Epicurus" in Traditions of Theology: Studies in Hellenistic Theology, Its Background and Aftermath, Dorothea, Frede, and André Laks (eds.), Brill, Boston, 2002. 
 Obbink, Dirk (2011)  "56. Orphism, Cosmogony, and Genealogy (Mus. fr. 14)" in Tracing Orpheus: Studies of Orphic Fragments, edited by Miguel Herrero de Jáuregui, Walter de Gruyter, 2011. .
 Osborne, Robin, "Looking on – Greek Style. Does the sculpted girl speak to women too?" in  Classical Greece: Ancient Histories and Modern Archaeologies, Morris, Ian (ed.), Cambridge University Press, 1994. .
 Ovid, Amores in Heroides. Amores, translated by Grant Showerman, revised by G. P. Goold, Loeb Classical Library No. 41, Cambridge, Massachusetts, Harvard University Press, 1977. . Online version at Harvard University Press.
 Ovid, Ars Amatoria in Art of Love. Cosmetics. Remedies for Love. Ibis. Walnut-tree. Sea Fishing. Consolation, translated by J. H. Mozley, revised by G. P. Goold, Loeb Classical Library No. 232, Cambridge, Massachusetts, Harvard University Press, 1929. Online version at Harvard University Press.
 Ovid, Ovid's Fasti: With an English translation by Sir James George Frazer, London: W. Heinemann LTD; Cambridge, Massachusetts, Harvard University Press, 1959. Internet Archive.
 Ovid, Heroides in Heroides. Amores, translated by Grant Showerman, revised by G. P. Goold, Loeb Classical Library No. 41, Cambridge, Massachusetts, Harvard University Press, 1977. . Online version at Harvard University Press.
 Ovid. Metamorphoses, Volume I: Books 1-8. Translated by Frank Justus Miller. Revised by G. P. Goold. Loeb Classical Library No. 42. Cambridge, Massachusetts: Harvard University Press, 1977, first published 1916. . Online version at Harvard University Press.
 Ovid. Metamorphoses, Volume II: Books 9-15. Translated by Frank Justus Miller. Revised by G. P. Goold. Loeb Classical Library No. 43. Cambridge, Massachusetts: Harvard University Press, 1984, first published 1916. . Online version at Harvard University Press.
 Oxford Classical Dictionary, second edition,  Hammond, N.G.L. and Howard Hayes Scullard (editors), Oxford University Press, 1992. .
 Page, Denys Lionel, Sir, Select Papyri, Volume III: Poetry, translated by Denys L. Page, Loeb Classical Library No. 360, Cambridge, Massachusetts, Harvard University Press, 1941. . Online version at Harvard University Press.
 Palagia, Olga (1998), The Pediments of the Parthenon, BRILL, 1998. .
 Palagia, Olga (2005), "Fire from Heaven: Pediments and Akroteria of the Parthenon" in The Parthenon: From Antiquity to the Present, edited by Jenifer Neils, Cambridge University Press, 2005. .
 Pannen, Imke,  When the Bad Bleeds: Mantic Elements in English Renaissance Revenge Tragedy, Volume 3 of Representations & Reflections; V&R unipress GmbH, 2010. .
 Parisinou, Eva, "Brightness personified: light and devine image in ancient Greece" in Personification In The Greek World: From Antiquity To Byzantium, editors Emma Stafford, Judith Herrin, Ashgate Publishing, Ltd., 2005. .
 Parker, Robert, Polytheism and Society at Athens, Oxford University Press, 2005. .
 Pausanias, Pausanias Description of Greece with an English Translation by W.H.S. Jones, Litt.D., and H.A. Ormerod, M.A., in 4 Volumes. Cambridge, Massachusetts, Harvard University Press; London, William Heinemann Ltd. 1918. Online version at the Perseus Digital Library.
 Picón, Carlos A.; Hemingway, Seán, Pergamon and the Hellenistic Kingdoms of the Ancient World, Yale University Press, 2016, .
 Pindar, Odes, Diane Arnson Svarlien. 1990. Online version at the Perseus Digital Library.
 Plato, Plato in Twelve Volumes, Vol. 1 translated by Harold North Fowler; Introduction by W.R.M. Lamb. Cambridge, Massachusetts, Harvard University Press; London, William Heinemann Ltd. 1966
 Plutarch, Moralia. 16 vols. (vol. 13: 13.1 & 13.2, vol. 16: index), transl. by Frank Cole Babbitt (vol. 1–5) et al., series: "Loeb Classical Library" (LCL, vols. 197–499). Cambridge, Massachusetts: Harvard University Press et al., 1927–2004.
 Powell, Barry B. Classical Myth, Ninth edition, Oxford University Press, 2020. .
 Psaroudakes, Stelios, "Mesomedes' Hymn to the Sun: The Precipitation of Logos in the Melos", in Music, Text, and Culture in Ancient Greece, editors: Phillips, Tom, and Armand D'Angour, Oxford University Press, 2018. .
 Pseudo-Plutarch, About Rivers and Mountains and Things Found in Them, translated by Thomas M. Banchich, with Sarah Brill, Emilyn Haremza, Dustin Hummel, and Ryan Post, Canisius College Translated Texts, Number 4, Canisius College, Buffalo, New York, 2010. PDF.
 Quintus Smyrnaeus, Quintus Smyrnaeus: The Fall of Troy, translated by A.S. Way, Cambridge, Massachusetts, Harvard University Press, 1913. Internet Archive.
 Ridgeway, Brunilde Sismondo, Hellenistic Sculpture II: The Styles of ca. 200–100 B.C., The University of Wisconsin Press, 2000.
 Robertson, Martin (1981), A Shorter History of Greek Art, Cambridge University Press. .
 Robertson, Martin (1992), The Art of Vase-Painting in Classical Athens, Cambridge University Press. .
 Robertson, Noel (1996), "Athena's Shrines and Festivals" in Worshipping Athena: Panathenaia and Parthenon, The University of Wisconsin Press. .
 Roman, Luke, Monica Roman, Encyclopedia of Greek and Roman Mythology, Facts on File, 2010. .
 Roscher, Wilhelm Heinrich, Über Selene und Verwandtes, B.G. Teubner, Leipzig 1890.
 Savignoni L. 1899. "On Representations of Helios and of Selene", The Journal of Hellenic Studies 19: pp. 265–272.
 Seyffert, Oskar, A Dictionary of Classical Antiquities, Mythology, Religion, Literature and Art, from the German of Dr. Oskar Seyffert, S. Sonnenschein, 1901. Internet Archive.
 Seneca, Tragedies, Volume I: Hercules. Trojan Women. Phoenician Women. Medea. Phaedra. Edited and translated by John G. Fitch. Loeb Classical Library No. 62. Cambridge, Massachusetts: Harvard University Press, 2018. . Online version at Harvard University Press.
 Shear, T.L., Jr., Trophies of Victory: Public Building in Periklean Athens, Princeton University Press, 2016.
 Servius, Commentary on the Georgics of Vergil, Georgius Thilo, Ed. 1881. Online version at the Perseus Digital Library (Latin).
 Smith, William; Dictionary of Greek and Roman Biography and Mythology, London (1873).
 Sommerstein, Alan H., Aeschylus: Persians, Seven against Thebes, Suppliants, Prometheus Bound, edited and translated by Alan H. Sommerstein, Loeb Classical Library No. 145. Cambridge, Massachusetts, Harvard University Press, 2009. . Online version at Harvard University Press.
 Sorabella, Jean, "A Roman Sarcophagus and Its Patron." Metropolitan Museum Journal, Vol. 36 (2001). Downloadable PDF available at MetPublications.
 Sorrenti, Stefania, "Les représentations figurées de Jupiter Dolichénien à Rome," in La terra sigillata tardo-italica decorata del Museo nazionale romano, "L'Erma" di Bretschneider, 1999).
 Statius, Thebaid, Volume I: Thebaid: Books 1-7, edited and translated by D. R. Shackleton Bailey, Loeb Classical Library No. 207, Cambridge, Massachusetts, Harvard University Press, 2004. . Online version at Harvard University Press.
 Statius, Thebaid, Volume II: Thebaid: Books 8-12. Achilleid, edited and translated by D. R. Shackleton Bailey, Loeb Classical Library No. 498. Cambridge, Massachusetts, Harvard University Press, 2004. . Online version at Harvard University Press.
 Stoll, Heinrich Wilhelm, Handbook of the religion and mythology of the Greeks, With a Short Account of The Religious System of the Romans, tr. by R.B. Paul, and ed. by T.K. Arnold, London, Francis & John Rivington, 1852.
 Strabo, Geography, Editors, H.C. Hamilton, Esq., W. Falconer, M.A., London. George Bell & Sons. 1903. Online version at the Perseus Digital Library.
 
 Taylor, Thomas, The Hymns of Orpheus, Philosophical Research Society; Limited edition (June 1987). .
 Theocritus in Theocritus, Moschus, Bion, edited and translated by Neil Hopkinson, Loeb Classical Library No. 28, Cambridge, Massachusetts, Harvard University Press, 2015. . Online version at Harvard University Press.
 Theocritus, Bion of Smyrna, Moschus, Theocritus, Bion et Moschus. Graece et Latine. Accedunt virorum doctorum animadversiones, scholia, indices; et M. Æmilii Porti Lexicon Doricum, Volume 2, London Sumptibus Ricardi Priestley, 1826.
 Thomas, Edmund. "From the panteon of the gods to the Pantheon of Rome" in Pantheons: Transformations of a Monumental Idea, Ashgate Publishing, Ltd., 2004. .
 Tryphiodorus, The Taking of Ilios in Oppian, Colluthus, and Tryphiodorus, translated by A. W. Mair, Loeb Classical Library No. 219, Cambridge, Massachusetts, Harvard University Press, 1928. . Online version at Harvard University Press. Internet Archive.
 Valerius Flaccus, Argonautica, translated by J. H. Mozley, Loeb Classical Library No. 286. Cambridge, Massachusetts, Harvard University Press; London, William Heinemann Ltd. 1928. Online version at Harvard University Press.
 Vergados, Athanassios, The "Homeric Hymn to Hermes": Introduction, Text and Commentary, Walter de Gruyter, 2012. .
 Verhelst, Berenice, Direct Speech in Nonnus’ Dionysiaca: Narrative and rhetorical functions of the characters' "varied" and "many-faceted" words, BRILL, 2016.  (e-book).  (hardback).
 
 Virgil, Georgics in Bucolics, Aeneid, and Georgics Of Vergil. J. B. Greenough. Boston. Ginn & Co. 1900. Online version at the Perseus Digital Library.
 Walters, Henry Beauchamp, Samuel Birch, History of Ancient Pottery: Greek, Etruscan, and Roman, Volume 2, John Murray, 1905.
 West, M. L. (1983), The Orphic Poems, Clarendon Press Oxford, 1983. .
 West, M. L. (2003), Homeric Hymns. Homeric Apocrypha. Lives of Homer, edited and translated by Martin L. West, Loeb Classical Library No. 496, Cambridge, Massachusetts, Harvard University Press, 2003.  . Online version at Harvard University Press.
 
 Willetts, R. F., Cretan Cults and Festivals, Greenwood Press, 1980. .
 Xenis, Georgios A., Scholia vetera in Sophoclis "Oedipum Coloneum", De Gruyter, 2018. . Online version at De Gruyter. Google Books.
 Zschietzschmann, W, Hellas and Rome: The Classical World in Pictures, Kessinger Publishing, 2006. .

External links
 
 
 
 SELENE in The Theoi Project
 SELENE in Mythopedia

 
Divine women of Zeus
Greek goddesses
Lunar goddesses
Personifications in Greek mythology
Titans (mythology)
Light goddesses
Women of Helios
Magic goddesses
Metamorphoses characters
Horned deities
Childhood goddesses
Characters in the Argonautica
Night goddesses
Consorts of Pan (god)